Terovo is a rural locality (a village) in Andomskoye Rural Settlement, Vytegorsky District, Vologda Oblast, Russia. The population was 13 as of 2002.

Geography 
Terovo is located 30 km north of Vytegra (the district's administrative centre) by road. Troshigino is the nearest rural locality.

References 

Rural localities in Vytegorsky District